Hana Vave is the name of the northernmost bay on the west coast of Fatu Hiva in French Polynesia. The bay is sometimes called the Bay of Virgins, a translation of the French name Baie des Vierges.

The French name originally given to the bay was Baie des Verges (Bay of Penes), because of the phallus-shaped basalt spires that rise on either side of its entrance.

Hana Vave is also the name of a small village located at the head of the bay, which in 2020 had an estimated population of 346.

References

Bodies of water of the Marquesas Islands
Bays of the Pacific Ocean